Nelson Hackett (born ) was an escaped slave who fled to Canada.  In 1841 he escaped from his Arkansas master, Alfred Wallace on a stolen horse, and 6 weeks later crossed the border and entered Upper Canada near what today is Windsor. Hackett was arrested and retained in Chatham.

Wallace, however, refused to let the matter drop, and he was well connected, particularly to the Governor of Arkansas, Archibald Yell.  Wallace and an associate, George C. Grigg, travelled to Canada and made out dispositions against Hackett for stealing the horse, as well as a gold watch belonging to Wallace.

Despite opposition from Upper Canada's Attorney General, William Henry Draper, Hackett was extradited to the United States on the order of Sir Charles Bagot, due to his theft of the watch, which exceeded what was necessary to take in order to facilitate his escape to freedom.
Public reaction from abolitionists, in England, Canada and the United States was strong.  Politicians in the British House of Commons and Upper Canada's executive council questioned the motives for the extradition, as well as its legality.

Wallace seems to have been intent on "teaching a lesson" to American slaves; namely that Canada would not prove to be a safe haven for them.  The fact that his legal bills far exceeded Hackett's market value seems to bear this out. In any event, his strategy failed. Hackett's escape brought more attention to Canada as a refuge for slaves, and when the extradition clause of the Webster–Ashburton Treaty was finally negotiated, slaves were protected from extradition to their former American masters.

Hackett's fate unknown after his return to Arkansas on whether he faced death as his punishment.

External links
Biography at the Dictionary of Canadian Biography Online

1810 births
Year of death missing
19th-century American slaves
People extradited from Canada to the United States